Iridomyrmex cappoinclinus is a species of ant belonging to the genus Iridomyrmex. Native to Australia, they have been mainly studied and observed in the Northern Territory. It was first described by Shattuck back in 1993.

References

Iridomyrmex
Hymenoptera of Australia
Insects described in 1993